Star Island may refer to:

Islands

United States
Star Island (New Hampshire), one of the Isles of Shoals, New Hampshire
Star Island (Miami Beach), a neighborhood and artificial island in the city of Miami Beach
Star Island, Minnesota, an island in Cass Lake
Star Island, Rhode Island, an island in Providence County
Star Island, New York, an island in Lake Montauk on Long Island

Worldwide
Star Island, Ontario, an island in Lake Kabenung in Northern Ontario, Canada
Star Island, Turks and Caicos Islands, a man-made island adjacent to Mangrove Cay, northeast of Providenciales, Turks and Caicos Islands

In literature
Star Island (novel), a 2010 novel by Carl Hiaasen